Neferneferuaten Tasherit or Neferneferuaten the younger (meaning Most Beautiful One of Aten - Younger) (14th century BCE) was an ancient Egyptian princess of the 18th Dynasty and the fourth daughter of Pharaoh Akhenaten and his Great Royal Wife Nefertiti.

Family
Neferneferuaten was born between ca. year 8 and 9 of her father's reign. She was the fourth of six known daughters of the royal couple. It is likely that she was born in Akhetaten, the capital founded by her father. Her name Neferneferuaten ("Beauty of the Beauties of Aten" or "Most Beautiful One of Aten") is the exact copy of the name Nefertiti took in the 5th regnal year. ("Ta-sherit" simply means "the younger"). She had three older sisters named Meritaten, Meketaten, and Ankhesenpaaten (later known as Ankhesenamun), and two younger sisters named  Neferneferure and Setepenre.

Life

One of the earliest depictions of Neferneferuaten Tasherit is on a mural from the King’s House in Amarna. She is depicted sitting on  a pillow with her sister Neferneferure. The fresco is dated to ca. year 9 of Akhenaten, and the entire family is depicted, including the baby Setepenre.

Neferneferuaten Tasherit is depicted in several tombs in Amarna and appears on monuments. A statue base originally from Amarna, but later moved to Heliopolis, mentions the Aten and Akhenaten, while in texts in a lower register the royal daughters Ankhesenpaaten and Neferneferuaten Tasherit are mentioned.

In the tomb of Huya, the chief Steward of Neferneferuaten's grandmother Queen Tiye, Neferneferuaten is shown in a family scene on a lintel on the north wall. The extended scene shows Akhenaten and Nefertiti on the left with their four eldest daughters, while on the right hand side Amenhotep III, Queen Tiye and princess Baketaten are shown. In the reward scene in the tomb of Meryre II, Neferneferuaten Tasherit is shown with four of her sisters (only Setepenre in absent).

She is depicted at the Durbar in year 12 in the tomb of the Overseer of the royal quarters Meryre II in Amarna. Akhenaten and Nefertiti are shown seated in a kiosk, receiving tribute from foreign lands. The daughters of the royal couple are shown standing behind their parents. Neferneferuaten is the first daughter in the lower register. She is holding an object which is too damaged to identify. Her sisters Neferneferure and Setepenre are standing behind her. Neferneferure is shown holding a pet gazelle and Setepenre is shown reaching over to pet the animal.

Neferneferuaten also appears in the award scene of Panehesy. She is shown standing in the building near the window of appearance as her parents, Akhenaten and Nefertiti, bestow honors upon the first servant of the Aten named Panehesy. In another scene in this tomb Neferneferuaten and her three older sisters all accompany their parents who are shown offering flowers to the Aten. The four royal daughters are all shown holding bouquets of flowers.

Neferneferuaten Tasherit is shown with her sisters Meritaten and Ankhesenpaaten mourning the death of Meketaten in ca. year 14 in the Royal Tomb in Amarna. Her younger sisters Neferneferure and Setepenre are not present in this scene.

Final years and death
It is unknown what became of Neferneferuaten Tasherit, but it has been suggested she died before Tutankhamun and Ankhesenpaaten came to the throne. It is possible she was one of the persons buried in chamber  in the Royal Tomb in Amarna. 

It has been suggested that she might be identified as Akhenaten's co-regent, whose exact identity is still disputed, but who could have been a woman. Other women who have been suggested as candidates for the identity of this female ruler are Queen Nefertiti (her mother) and her older sister Meritaten.

References

Princesses of the Eighteenth Dynasty of Egypt
14th-century BC Egyptian women
Children of Akhenaten
Nefertiti